Young River may refer to:

Young River (New Zealand)
Young River (Western Australia)